Chromosome 11 open reading frame 87 is a protein that in humans is encoded by the C11orf87 gene.

References

Further reading